Johan Arnold Smellekamp (16 January 1812 in Amsterdam, Netherlands – 25 May 1866 in Bloemfontein, Orange Free State) was a Dutchman who pioneered trade with the Boer Voortrekker states in South Africa and later became a civil servant, politician and law agent in the Orange Free State.

Biography

Family
Smellekamp was the son of Jan Hendrik Smellekamp and Johanna Maria Coeré.

Smellekamp married Maria Catharina Görlach, who died. He then remarried to Hillegonda Sara Wilvinger, twenty-eight-year-old daughter of Johannes Wilvinger and Hendrika Wassenaar, in Zaandam on 8 December 1852. Smellekamp had three daughters and a son.

Trading with South Africa
Smellekamp worked as supercargo for the Amsterdam trading company of J.A. Klijn & Co., under the direction of G.G. Ohrig. In 1841 he made a first voyage to Port Natal with the objective to establish trading contracts with the Voortrekkers who had established the Natalia Republic only two years before. At the time of Smellekamp's arrival, the British under Captain Thomas Charlton Smith were several days marching away from Port Natal, ready to occupy the town.

Together with Ohrig Smellekamp visited  Pietermaritzburg to meet with the Volksraad of Natalia. They were received with great enthusiasm by the population. The street were decorated with flags and other cloths, including underwear. The people of Natalia were – mistakenly – under the impression that Smellekamp's arrival heralded a full-scale intervention by the Netherlands. Smellekamp very much enjoyed his sudden importance and did nothing to correct the impression. The Volksraad gave some promises about trade in the future and put in a request for immigrants to strengthen the Boer state.

The deteriorating political situation brought the Volksraad to offer Natal as a colonial possession to William II of the Netherlands (resolution 25 April 1842) in case Britain were to annex the Voortrekker territory. Smellekamp travelled back to the Netherlands via Cape Town. On the way he was arrested at Swellendam because he did not have the proper travel documents. In the meantime, the British government started official correspondence with the Dutch government about Smellekamp's activities in Natal, being convinced he was an agitator. King William II rejected the proposed connection between the Netherlands and the Voortrekkers of Natal and before the year was out he apologised to White Hall for the affray caused by Smellekamp and his activities.

In 1843 Smellekamp returned to Natal, but was refused entry into Port Natal by the British, and found himself obliged to go to Delagoa Bay instead. In the Winter of 1844 Hendrik Potgieter, the leader of the Potchefstroom-Winburg Republic, which had declared independence on 9 April 1844, visited Delagoa Bay looking for a free passage to the sea. He negotiated with Smellekamp, who advised him to move his people north of the 26th degree of latitude, outside of the British sphere of influence, and with an opportunity to trade freely with Dutch traders. The discussions resulted in Potgieter and a group of Voortrekkers from the former Natalia Republic to move to the North-East Transvaal where they established Andries-Ohrigstad.

Smellekamp remained in Southern and East Africa for almost two years, before returning to the Netherlands in 1846. Here he quarreled with his boss about the best way of bringing trade to South Africa, whereby Smellekamp propagated an open market. Obviously, from the point of view of the trading company, director Ohrig was not in favour of this idea. Smellekamp made three more trips to South Africa, twice at a loss. With the final voyage, in 1853, he migrated to South Africa and established himself in Lydenburg in the Transvaal in February 1854. Soon after his arrival in Lydenburg, Smellekamp fell out with the Dutch reformed minister Rev. Dirk van der Hoff of Potchefstroom, also a Dutchman, at the general synod of the Dutch Reformed church in Rustenburg. Smellekamp lost, and was first censured by the church, then fined by the Volksraad and finally banished. He moved to Cape Town, where he published a rebuttal to the accusations made against him.

Civil servant and law practice
An active person, his banishment did not deter Smellekamp from a new engagement with the Boer republics. He moved to the Orange Free State, where he was quickly appointed Landdrost of Bloemfontein (1 October 1854). Equally quickly, Smellekamp's volatile character triggered a conflict with State President Boshoff, and a short but venomous correspondence between the two men. The result was that Smellekamp was dismissed as Landdrost (31 May 1856). However, at the basis of the conflict was a real political controversy about the international position of the state, in which Smellekamp stood not alone. Government Secretary Groenendaal stood at his side, against Boshoff. Tha controversy was about the mission of the Dutchman Cornelis Hiddingh, who came to Bloemfontein in January 1856, as official Dutch envoy to present a flag and coat of arms of the Orange Free State to the government, as a gift from King William III of the Netherlands. Boshoff, who was in the dark about the parafernalia having been ordered by his predecessor, and being very cautious in order not to offend the British government, hesitated to receive Hiddingh in an official capacity. In turn, Groenendaal and Smellekamp started a press offensive against Boshoff in newspapers in both Bloemfontein and Cape Town, so strongly condemning Boshoff for his actions that the latter had no choice but to dismiss both.

After his dismissal Smellekamp remained in Bloemfontein, where he settled as a licensed law agent. The relationship with President Boshoff did not improve, however, and Smellekamp agitated against him until he retired from office in 1859.

Smellekamp was definitely not unpopular with everybody in the Orange Free State. In 1863 he stood for election to the Volksraad for the constituency of Ladysmith and won the seat. He remained a member of the Volksraad until his early death three years later. An active freemason, Smellekamp was also Governing Master of the Union Lodge (Loge Unie) at Bloemfontein.

Personality and influence
Smellekamp had a restless and irascible personality. It made him many enemies and hampered his walk through life. Nevertheless, his influence on the early formation of the Boer republics in the hinterland of the Cape Colony was considerable. Without him, the Dutch interest in the Voortrekker movement and the fate of the 'Boer kinsmen', resulting in a migration drive as well as long-standing cultural connections, would most likely not have emerged in the way it did.

Despite his volatile character, Smellekamp had a good feeling for the necessity to build up a national consciousness in the new republics, necessary for their survival in the face of many internal and external challenges. That he was seen as propagating the interests of the 'Dutch faction' in the Orange Free State might have been a valid criticism, but only up to a point. In Smellemap's view building a new identity was building a joint identity, and a strong alliance with the Netherlands – against continued British imperial ambitions – was a helpful instrument in this project. This view also fits his enthusiasm for the national anthem, written by H.A.L. Hamelberg and accepted as such by the Volksraad on 24 February 1866. In his capacity of Governing Master of the Union Lodge Smellekamp facilitated the widespread and free distribution of the anthem among the burghers of the Orange Free State.

See also
Jan Willem Spruyt

Bibliography

References

Notes

Literature
 
 
 
 

1812 births
1866 deaths
Afrikaner people
Dutch emigrants to South Africa
Members of the Volksraad of the Orange Free State
Businesspeople from Amsterdam